Richard Dye (May 11, 1902January 3, 1952), known professionally as Dick Curtis, was an American actor who made over 230 film and television appearances during his career.

Early years
Curtis was born in Newport, Kentucky, the son of Frank Dye and Elizabeth Faulkner Dye.

Career
After having limited work in Hollywood, Curtis acted on stage in New York and toured in a variety of productions from 1926 to 1930.

Standing at 6' 3", Curtis appeared in films stretching from Charles Starrett to The Three Stooges. In most of his films, he played villains or heavies. He made television appearances on The Lone Ranger and The Range Rider. He appeared in California Gold Rush, Spook Town, The Gene Autry Show, and many others.

Curtis appeared in such Three Stooges films as Yes, We Have No Bonanza, You Nazty Spy!, and The Three Troubledoers.

Pioneertown
With the help of his friend and actor Russell Hayden, Curtis helped develop Pioneertown, a western movie set location in Southern California that was used for many television and film westerns. The project was done in partnership with Roy Rogers and the Sons of the Pioneers.

Personal life 
Curtis was married to silent-film actress Ruth Sullivan, who survived him.

Death
Curtis died at age 49 of pneumonia brought on by lung cancer. Curtis's final appearance with the Stooges was as Shemp Howard's dental patient in The Tooth Will Out, filmed in February 1951.

He is buried at Holy Cross Cemetery in Culver City, California.

Selected filmography

 Tell It to the Marines (1926) - Marine in Barracks (uncredited)
 Shooting Straight (1930) - Butch
 Up the River (1930) - New Inmate (uncredited)
 The Silver Horde (1930) - Fight Spectator (uncredited)
 Secret Service(1931) - Prisoner Buying Goobers (uncredited)
 Hell's House (1932) - Cop on the Beat (uncredited)
 Girl Crazy (1932) - Cowboy Giving Directions (uncredited)
 The Famous Ferguson Case (1932) - O'Toole (uncredited)
 King Kong (1933) - Member of Ship's Crew (uncredited)
 King Kelly of the U.S.A. (1934) - Otto - Palace Guard (uncredited)
 A Successful Failure (1934) - Man in Rally Crowd (uncredited)
 The Silver Streak (1934) - Boulder Dam Foreman (uncredited)
 Romance in Manhattan (1935) - Man at East River (uncredited)
 Clive of India (1935) - Hoodlum on Dock (uncredited)
 Northern Frontier (1935) - Pete - Henchman (uncredited)
 Mutiny Ahead (1935) - Stevens
 Wilderness Mail (1935) - Jacques - Henchman
 The Miracle Rider (1935, Serial) - Copelee (uncredited)
 The Nitwits (1935) - Cop on Stakeout (uncredited)
 Code of the Mounted (1935) - Snakey - Henchman
 The Arizonian (1935) - Henchman (uncredited)
 Trails of the Wild (1935) - Henchman Roper
 Western Frontier (1935) - Pioneer Settler (uncredited)
 Condemned to Live (1935) - Villager at Pit Rim (uncredited)
 Skybound (1935) - Master of Ceremonies (uncredited)
 Western Courage (1935) - Henchman Bat (uncredited)
 Racing Luck (1935) - 'Dynamite'
 Just My Luck (1935) - Henchman (uncredited)
 Federal Agent (1936) - Curbside Cabbie (uncredited)
 Crashing Through Danger (1936) - Foreman
 Burning Gold (1936) - Swede
 Go-Get-'Em, Haines (1936) - Mike - Cab Driver (uncredited)
 Wildcat Trooper (1936) - Henri (uncredited)
 The Lion's Den (1936) - Slim Burtis - Henchman
 The Crooked Trail (1936) - Kirk - Miner (uncredited)
 Ghost Patrol (1936) - Henchman Charlie
 The Traitor (1936) - Henchman Morgan
 Phantom Patrol (1936) - Henchman Josef
 Daniel Boone (1936) - Vince - Frontiersman (uncredited)
 Wild Horse Round-Up (1936) - Bill
 Valley of Terror (1937) - Buck - Henchman
 The Singing Buckaroo (1937) - Odie - Henchman
 Blake of Scotland Yard (1937) - Nicky - Henchman
 The Gambling Terror (1937) - Henchman Dick
 Headline Crasher (1937) - Joe (uncredited)
 Trail of Vengeance (1937) - Cartwright - Henchman
 Motor Madness (1937) - Sailor (uncredited)
 Two Gun Law (1937) - Len Edwards
 Bar-Z Bad Men (1937) - Henchman Brent
 The Frame-Up (1937) - Slim (uncredited)
 Guns in the Dark (1937) - Brace Stevens
 A Lawman Is Born (1937) - Lefty Drogan
 One Man Justice (1937) - Henchman Hank Skinner
 Boothill Brigade (1937) - Bull Berke
 The Game That Kills (1937) - Whitey
 Moonlight on the Range (1937) - Hank - Henchman
 Life Begins with Love (1937) - Radical (uncredited)
 Counsel for Crime (1937) - Hood (uncredited)
 Murder in Greenwich Village (1937) - Campbell Security Guard (uncredited)
 The Old Wyoming Trail (1937) - Ed Slade
 Outlaws of the Prairie (1937) - Dragg
 Paid to Dance (1937) - Mike Givens
 The Shadow (1937) - Carlos
 Little Miss Roughneck (1938) - (uncredited)
 Penitentiary (1938) - Tex (uncredited)
 Cattle Raiders (1938) - Ed Munro
 Who Killed Gail Preston? (1938) - Henchman Mike
 Women in Prison (1938) - Mac
 Rawhide (1938) - Butch - Saunders Henchman
 Call of the Rockies (1938) - Matt Stark
 Law of the Plains (1938) - Jim Fletcher
 The Lone Wolf in Paris (1938) - Palace Vault Guard (uncredited)
 Reformatory (1938) - Guard (uncredited)
 The Main Event (1938) - Sawyer
 Squadron of Honor (1938) - Craig
 West of Cheyenne (1938) - Link Murdock
 City Streets (1938) - Madden - County Welfare Officer (uncredited)
 South of Arizona (1938) - Ed Martin
 You Can't Take It with You (1938) - Strongarm Man (uncredited)
 The Colorado Trail (1938) - Henchman Slash Driscoll
 Juvenile Court (1938) - Detective Capturing Dutch Adams (uncredited)
 West of the Santa Fe (1938) - Matt Taylor
 The Spider's Web (1938, Serial) - Malloy (uncredited)
 The Lady Objects (1938) - Jail Guard (uncredited)
 Adventure in Sahara (1938) - Karnoldi
 Blondie (1938) - Daily Gazette Reporter (uncredited)
 Rio Grande (1938) - Ed Barker
 Flat Foot Stooges (1938, Short) - Mr. Reardon
 The Little Adventuress (1938) - Race Starter (uncredited)
 Smashing the Spy Ring (1938) - Williams (uncredited)
 Homicide Bureau (1939) - Radio Broadcaster (voice, uncredited)
 The Thundering West (1939) - Wolf Munro
 North of Shanghai (1939) - Creighton
 The Lone Wolf Spy Hunt (1939) - Heavy (uncredited)
 Flying G-Men (1939, Serial) - Henchman Korman
 My Son Is a Criminal (1939) - Gangster (uncredited)
 We Want Our Mummy (1939, Short) - Jackson (uncredited)
 Let Us Live (1939) - Convict on Death Row (uncredited)
 Romance of the Redwoods (1939) - Gas Station Attendant (uncredited)
 Blind Alley (1939) - Trooper with Joe (uncredited)
 Spoilers of the Range (1939) - Lobo Savage
 Outside These Walls (1939) - Flint
 Mandrake the Magician (1939, Serial) - Dorgan - Henchman (Chs. 6–8)
 Yes, We Have No Bonanza (1939, Short) - Maxey
 Missing Daughters (1939) - Henchman (uncredited)
 Western Caravans (1939) - Mort Kohler
 Overland with Kit Carson (1939, Serial) - Drake - Henchman
 Behind Prison Gates (1939) - Capt. Simmons
 The Man They Could Not Hang (1939) - Jury Foreman Clifford Kearney
 Riders of Black River (1939) - Blaize Carewe
 Outpost of the Mounties (1939) - Wade Beaumont
 Those High Grey Walls (1939) - Convict (uncredited)
 Oily to Bed, Oily to Rise (1939, Short) - Clipper - Swindler in Back Seat (uncredited)
 The Taming of the West (1939) - Rawhide
 Scandal Sheet (1939) - Guard
 The Amazing Mr. Williams (1939) - Joe (uncredited)
 The Stranger from Texas (1939) - Bat Stringer
 Two-Fisted Rangers (1939) - Henchman Dirk Hogan
 My Son Is Guilty (1939) - Monk
 You Nazty Spy! (1940, Short) - Mr. Ohnay (uncredited)
 Pioneers of the Frontier (1940) - Matt Brawley
 Blondie on a Budget (1940) - Tony - Mechanic (uncredited)
 Bullets for Rustlers (1940) - Strang
 Rockin' Thru the Rockies (1940, Short) - Indian Chief (uncredited)
 Blazing Six Shooters (1940) - Lash Bender
 Terry and the Pirates (1940, Serial) - Master Fang
 Men Without Souls (1940) - Duke
 Texas Stagecoach (1940) - Shoshone Larsen
 Boom Town (1940) - Hiring Boss (uncredited)
 Wyoming (1940) - Corky - Henchman (uncredited)
 Ragtime Cowboy Joe (1940) - Bo Gilman
 Three Men from Texas (1940) - Gardner - Henchman
 The Son of Monte Cristo (1940) - Guard (uncredited)
 So Ends Our Night (1941) - Gestapo Stormtrooper (uncredited)
 Across the Sierras (1941) - Mitch Carew
 The Round Up (1941) - Ed Crandall
 Billy the Kid (1941) - Kirby Claxton
 I Was a Prisoner on Devil's Island (1941) - Jules
 Mystery Ship (1941) - Van Brock
 Stick to Your Guns (1941) - Nevada Teale
 Honky Tonk (1941) - Tough Man on Train (uncredited)
 Sea Raiders (1941, Serial) - Mate on the 'Astoria' [Chs. 4-5] (uncredited)
 Arizona Cyclone (1941) - Quirt Crenshaw
 Ellery Queen and the Murder Ring (1941) - Policeman (uncredited)
 Shut My Big Mouth (1942) - Henchman (uncredited)
 Two Yanks in Trinidad (1942) - Sea Captain
 Men of San Quentin (1942) - Butch Mason
 Tombstone, the Town Too Tough to Die (1942) - Frank McLowery
 Jackass Mail (1942) - Jim Swade
 Vengeance of the West (1942) - Jeff Gorman
 City of Silent Men (1942) - Frank Muller
 Pardon My Gun (1942) - Clint Hayes (uncredited)
 You Can't Beat the Law (1943) - Prison Guard (uncredited)
 Riders of the Northwest Mounted (1943) - Victor Renaud (uncredited)
 Batman (1943, Serial) - Agent Croft of Section 50 [Ch. 10-12] (uncredited)
 Higher Than a Kite (1943, Short) - Gen. Bommel (uncredited)
 Salute to the Marines (1943) - Cpl. Mosley
 The Cross of Lorraine (1943) - Nazi Guard in Village (uncredited)
 Jack London (1943) - Cannery Foreman (uncredited)
 Cowboy in the Clouds (1943) - Roy Madison
 The Phantom (1943, Serial) - Tartar Chieftain (uncredited)
 Crash Goes the Hash (1944, Short) - Prince Shaam of Ubeedarn
 Lady in the Death House (1944) - Willis Millen
 Hey, Rookie (1944) - Sergeant (uncredited)
 Gambler's Choice (1944) - Mr. Hadley (uncredited)
 The Black Parachute (1944) - German Lieutenant (uncredited)
 Spook Town (1944) - Sam Benson
 Waterfront (1944) - Drunken Sailor (uncredited)
 Mystery of the River Boat (1944, Serial) - Craig Cassard
 High Powered (1945) - Worker (uncredited)
 The Master Key (1945, Serial) - Reicher (uncredited)
 The Great John L. (1945) - Waldo (uncredited)
 Blonde from Brooklyn (1945) - Soldier (uncredited)
 Scared Stiff (1945) - Bus Driver (uncredited)
 Wagon Wheels Westward (1945) - Henchman Tuttle
 Scarlet Street (1945) - Detective (uncredited)
 The Bandit of Sherwood Forest (1946) - Castle Gate Guard (uncredited)
 Abilene Town (1946) - 'Cap' Ryker
 The Scarlet Horseman (1946, Serial) - Jed (Ch 2) (uncredited)
 California Gold Rush (1946) - Chopin - the Harmonica Killer
 Song of Arizona (1946) - Henchman Bart
 Lost City of the Jungle (1946) - Johnson
 The Three Troubledoers (1946, Short) - Badlands Blackie
 Traffic in Crime (1946) - Jake Schultz
 Wild Beauty (1946) - John Andrews
 Lawless Breed (1946) - Bartley Mellon and Captain Isaac Mellon
 Santa Fe Uprising (1946) - Henchman Luke Case
 Renegade Girl (1946) - Joe Barnes
 Wyoming (1947) - Ed Lassiter
 Navajo Trail Raiders (1949) - Henchman Brad
 The Outriders (1950) - Outrider at Dance (uncredited)
 Cargo to Capetown (1950) - Charlie - Sailor in Bar (uncredited)
 Wabash Avenue (1950) - Jim - Poker Player (uncredited)
 The Vanishing Westerner (1950) - Bartender
 Rock Island Trail (1950) - Barton - Railroad Agitator (uncredited)
 The Gunfighter (1950) - Townsman at Funeral (uncredited)
 Covered Wagon Raid (1950) - Henchman Grif
 The Sun Sets at Dawn (1950) - Guard (uncredited)
 The Jackpot (1950) - Moving Man (uncredited)
 Three Arabian Nuts (1951, Short) - Hassan
 Inside Straight (1951) - Marshal (uncredited)
 Rawhide (1951) - Hawley (uncredited)
 Whirlwind (1951) - Lon Kramer
 Don't Throw That Knife (1951, Short) - Mr. Wycoff
 Roar of the Iron Horse - Rail-Blazer of the Apache Trail (1951) - Campo - The Baron's Chief Gunman
 Lorna Doone (1951) - Garth (uncredited)
 The Texas Rangers (1951) - Prison Guard (uncredited)
 Government Agents vs. Phantom Legion (1951) - Regan
 The Red Badge of Courage (1951) - Veteran (uncredited)
 The Tooth Will Out (1951, Short) - Shemp's Last Patient (uncredited)
 Chicago Calling (1951) - Road Gang Foreman (uncredited)
 Rose of Cimarron (1952) - Clem Dawley
 My Six Convicts (1952) - Guard (uncredited)
 Bronco Buster (1952) - Bartender (uncredited) (final film role)

References

Pioneertown

External links

 
 
 Three Stooges Online Filmography

1902 births
1952 deaths
Male actors from Kentucky
American male film actors
Deaths from lung cancer in California
Burials at Holy Cross Cemetery, Culver City
20th-century American male actors
20th-century American comedians